Worcester Public Schools (WPS) is a school district serving the city of Worcester, Massachusetts, United States. It is the second-largest school district in the state behind Boston Public Schools.

Leadership
On October 8, 2015, Dr. Melinda Boone gave her notice to resign as head of the Worcester Public Schools (WPS) effective November 30. She began as Superintendent of Norfolk, Virginia in December 2015. The move left a vacancy in Worcester that was expected to be filled either by Marcos Rodrigues, South High Principal Maureen Binienda, Mary Meade Montague, or Sheila Harrity (who eventually left the district to become a superintendent of a regional school district). It was rumored that this vacancy would bring political divisions among key city leaders. The mayor (Joseph Petty), for example, who is also chair of the school committee wanted to fill the vacancy with someone of his choice. He did not consult any other school committee member, and angered many as a result.

The district is now led by a Superintendent, hired by the seven-member Worcester School Committee. Mrs. Maureen Binienda has served as Superintendent since June 2016. The district also hired a Chief Academic Officer, Marcos Rodrigues who has led the creation of innovation schools in the city, and has supported the principals in bringing rigor and relevance to all classrooms. Dr. Rodrigues started as a substitute teacher, followed by a stint as a paraprofessional and after earning a Doctorate joined Dr. Boone's leadership team.

Elected School Committee

2020 School Committee

Seven member elected School Committee (2 year terms) made up of City Council Mayor Joe Petty, and elected at-large: Dianna Biancheria, Laura Clancey, Jack Foley, Molly McCullough, John Monfredo, and Tracy O'Connell Novick.

2022 School Committee

New members of the School Committee include Jermoh Kamara, Susan Mailman, and Jermaine Johnson.

Schools

High schools
 Burncoat High School 
 Claremont Academy
 Doherty Memorial High School
 North High School 
 South High Community School
 University Park Campus School
 Worcester Technical High School
 Abby Kelley Foster Charter Public School

Middle schools
 Burncoat Middle School
 Forest Grove Middle School 
 Dr. Arthur F. Sullivan Middle School 
 Worcester East Middle School

Elementary schools 
Belmont Street Community School 
Burncoat Street Preparatory School
Canterbury Magnet Computer-Based School
Chandler Elementary Community School
Chandler Magnet School
City View Discovery School
Clark Street Developmental Learning School
Columbus Park Preparatory Academy
Elm Park Community School
Flagg Street School
Francis J. McGrath Elementary School
Gates Lane School 
Goddard School of Science and Technology
Grafton Street School
Heard Street Discovery Academy
Jacob Hiatt Magnet School
Lake View School
La Familia Dual Language School
Lincoln Street School
May Street School
Midland Street School
Nelson Place School
Norrback Avenue School
Quinsigamond School
Rice Square Elementary School
Roosevelt School
Tatnuck Magnet School
Thorndyke Road School
Union Hill School
Vernon Hill School
Wawecus Road School
West Tatnuck School
Worcester Arts Magnet School

See also
 List of school districts in Massachusetts

References

External links
 Official website

School districts in Massachusetts
Education in Worcester, Massachusetts
Government of Worcester, Massachusetts